Euxesta pacifica is a species of ulidiid or picture-winged fly in the genus Euxesta of the family Tephritidae.

References

pacifica
Insects described in 1995